"Terror Couple Kill Colonel" is a song by English gothic rock band Bauhaus, released as a stand-alone single in June 1980.

Release 
"Terror Couple Kill Colonel" reached No. 5 in the UK Independent Singles Chart.

The title came from a newspaper headline reporting a Red Army Faction attack that killed Paul Bloomquist.

Original sleeves were printed on a textured fabric. Two versions of this record exist; each having a different recording of "Terror Couple Kill Colonel (Version)" on the B-side. The rarer (mispressing) is noted by the matrix "TA1PE AD 7 AA1" in the run-out groove.

Track listing
"Terror Couple Kill Colonel"
"Scopes"
"Terror Couple Kill Colonel (Version)"

References

External links
 
 AllMusic review

Bauhaus (band) songs
Songs about crime
Songs about military officers
Songs about criminals
Songs based on actual events
1980 singles
4AD singles
1980 songs
Songs written by Daniel Ash